Emily Fitzroy (24 May 1860 – 3 March 1954) was an English theatre and film actress who eventually became an American citizen. She was at one time a leading lady in London for Sir Charles Wyndham.

She made her film debut in 1915. Her debut in sound films came in Show Boat (1929). She retired in 1944. Her last film was The White Cliffs of Dover (1944).

Her Broadway credits include What the Public Wants (1922), I.O.U. (1918), Rich Man, Poor Man (1916), Lady Patricia (1912), and Just to Get Married (1912).

Selected filmography

 Sins of Men (1916) - Minor Role
 East Lynne (1916) - Cornelia
 The Return of Eve (1916) - Mrs. Tupper-Bellamy
 A Broadway Saint (1919) - Martha Galt
 The Climbers (1919) - Mrs. Hunter
 Deadline at Eleven (1920) - Mrs. Martha Stevens
 The Man Who Lost Himself (1920) - Richester's Aunt
 Way Down East (1920) - Maria Poole - Landlady
 The Frisky Mrs. Johnson (1920) - Mrs. Chardley
 The New York Idea (1920) - Grace Phillimore
 Out of the Chorus (1921) - Mrs. Van Beekman
 Straight Is the Way (1921) - Mrs. Crabtree
 Wife Against Wife (1921) - Mrs. Dole
Jane Eyre (1921) - Grace Poole (a servant)
 The Splendid Lie (1922) - Mrs. Wolcott Delafield
 Find the Woman (1922) - Mrs. Napoli
 Fascination (1922) - The Marquesa de Lisa (her aunt)
 No Trespassing (1922) - Mrs. James Colton
 Fury (1923) - Matilda Brent
 Driven (1923) - Mrs. Tolliver
 The Purple Highway (1923) - Mrs. Carney
 Strangers of the Night (1923) - Mrs. Pengard
 Jealous Husbands (1923) - Amaryllis
 The Whispered Name (1924) - Amanda Stone
 Secrets (1924) - Mrs. Marlowe
 A Girl of the Limberlost (1924) - Kate Comstock
 Untamed Youth (1924) - Emily Ardis
 The Man Who Came Back (1924) - Aunt Isabel
 The Red Lily (1924) - Mama Bouchard
 His Hour (1924) - Princess Ardacheff
 Her Night of Romance (1924) - Nurse (scenes deleted)
 Love's Wilderness (1924) - Matilda Heath
 The Hooded Falcon (1924)
 The Spaniard (1925) - Maria
 The Golden Bed (1925) - Minor Role (uncredited)
 Learning to Love (1925) - Aunt Virginia
 The Lady (1925) - Madame Blanche
 Outwitted (1925) - Meg
 The Denial (1925) - Rena - Mother in Flashback
 Zander the Great (1925) - The Matron
 Are Parents People? (1925) - Margaret
 Never the Twain Shall Meet (1925) - Mrs. Pippy
 Thunder Mountain (1925) - Ma MacBirney
 The Winding Stair (1925) - Madame Muller
 Bobbed Hair (1925) - Aunt Celimena Moore
 Lazybones (1925) - Mrs. Fanning
 The Red Kimono (1925) - The Housekeeper
 What Happened to Jones (1926) - Mrs. Goodly
 The Bat (1926) - Miss Cornelia Van Gorder
 High Steppers (1926) - Mrs. Iffield
 Hard Boiled (1926) - Abigail Gregg
 No Babies Wanted (1926) - Landlady, 'Old Ironsides'
 Don Juan (1926) - The Dowager (uncredited)
 Marriage License? (1926) - Lady Heriot
 Bardelys the Magnificent (1926) - Vicomtesse de Lavedan
 The Cheerful Fraud (1926) - Mrs. Bytheway
 One Increasing Purpose (1927) - Mrs. Andiron
 The Sea Tiger (1927) - Mrs. Enos
 Orchids and Ermine (1927) - Mrs. Blom
 Married Alive (1927) - Mrs. Maggs Duxbury
 Mockery (1927) - Mrs. Gaidaroff
 Foreign Devils (1927) - Mrs. Conger
 Love Me and the World Is Mine (1927) - The Porter's Wife
 Once and Forever (1927) - Katherine
 Love (1927) - Grand Duchess
 Gentlemen Prefer Blondes (1928) - Lady Beekman
 The Trail of '98 (1928) - Mrs. Bulkey
 The Case of Lena Smith (1929) - Frau Hofrat
 Show Boat (1929) - Parthenia Ann Hawks
 The Bridge of San Luis Rey (1929) - Marquesa
 The Man from Blankley's (1930) - Mrs. Tidmarsh
 Dumbbells in Ermine (1930) - Gossiper (uncredited)
 The Flirting Widow (1930) - Aunt Ida
 Song o' My Heart (1930) - Aunt Elizabeth
 She's My Weakness (1930) - Mrs. Oberlander
 New Moon (1930) - Countess Anastasia Strogoff
 Unfaithful (1931) - Auntie Janie
 It's a Wise Child (1931) - Jane Appleby
 Misbehaving Ladies (1931) - Meta Oliver
 Detective Lloyd (1932, Serial) - The Manor Ghost
 Aren't We All? (1932) - Angela
 Lucky Ladies (1932) - Cleo Honeycutt
 High Society (1932) - Mrs. Strangeways
 Timbuctoo (1933) - Aunt Augusta
 Don Quixote (1933) - Sancho Panza's wife
 Her Imaginary Lover (1933) - Aunt Lydia Raleigh
 Dick Turpin (1934) - Minor Role (uncredited)
 The Man with Two Faces (1934) - Hattie
 Two Heads on a Pillow (1934) - Mrs. Van Suydam
 The Captain Hates the Sea (1934) - Mrs. Victoria Griswold
 China Seas (1935) - Mrs. Higgins (uncredited)
 She Couldn't Take It (1935) - Party Guest (uncredited)
 Border Flight (1936) - Old Maid (uncredited)
 The Bold Caballero (1936) - Lady Isabella's Chaperone
 Nothing Sacred (1937) - Guest at Banquet (uncredited)
 The Frontiersmen (1938) - School Teacher aka Snooksie
 Vigil in the Night (1940) - Sister Gilson
 The Flame of New Orleans (1941) - Cousin
 Two-Faced Woman (1941) - Rhumba Dancer (uncredited)
 Forever and a Day (1943) - Ms. Fulcher
 The White Cliffs of Dover (1944) - Spinster in Boardinghouse (uncredited) (final film role)

References

External links

Fitzroy as a young woman at age 30 on the November 15, 1890 cover of The Illustrated Sporting and Dramatic News magazine

1860 births
1954 deaths
English film actresses
English emigrants to the United States
Burials at Holy Cross Cemetery, Culver City
Actresses from London
20th-century English actresses